Major Norton, better known by his stage name Dubee, is an American rapper from Vallejo, California.

Biography 

A longtime player in the Northern California Bay Area rap scene, he is a former player of the City College of San Francisco's football team, where he was a running back and ranks 4th in the college's all-time single season rushing yards list and 8th in the all-time career rushing yards category.

Dubee signed his first deal with local producer Khayree Shaheed's Young Black Brotha Records in 1995 and released an album titled Dubee AKA Sugawolf (known as just Dubee at the time) on the imprint through Atlantic Records. He has been a long collaborator with performers from Northern California (such as label mates Ray Luv and Young Lay) and beyond.

Discography

Studio albums
Dubee a.k.a. Sugawolf (1995)
For That Scrilla (1997)
Dangerous Prospects (1999)
100% G-Shit (2001)
Turf Matic (2003)
Why Change Now? (2005)
Last of a Thizzin' Breed (2008)
Thizzmatic (2008)
Da "T" (2009)
The Furly Ghost Volume 2 (2010)

Collaboration albums
Turf Buccaneers with Cutthroat Committee (2001)
Money iz Motive with Cutthroat Committee (2005)

Compilation albums
Best of Sugawolf Pimp (2007)

Extended plays
Free with Little Bruce (2014)

References

African-American male rappers
American people convicted of drug offenses
City College of San Francisco Rams football players
Living people
Musicians from Vallejo, California
Players of American football from California
Rappers from the San Francisco Bay Area
Sportspeople from Vallejo, California
21st-century American rappers
21st-century American male musicians
Year of birth missing (living people)
21st-century African-American musicians